Monica Lee Gradischek, a 1994 graduate of New York University (NYU) is an American voice actress in animation, commercials, and video games as well as performing arts.  Monica starred in the Lifetime Television reality series "Off the Leash" in October 2006, while playing the role of Darlene in the Cartoon Network series Squirrel Boy.

Film and television roles 
 Sunshine – Emily "Sunshine" Miranda – (Winner Best Comedy, Mini DV Festival 2004, LA)
 Related – Co-Star
 As the World Turns – Recurring
 All My Children – Guest Star
 Duck – Co-Star
 Boom Man – Housewife from Hell
 The Fresh Beat Band – Ms. Piccolo
 Wizards of Waverly Place – Lunch Lady

Animation 
 Squirrel Boy – Darlene
 Rocket Power – Various Children
 Sniz and Fondue – Bianca
 The Simpsons – Various Children
 Shrek 2 (Trailer) – Lead Singer
 Prickles, The Cactus (Pilot) – Prickles
 Bad Jenny (Pilot) – Mom
 The Fresh Beat Band – Ms. Piccolo

Theater 
 Bark! The Musical – Boo – (The Coast Playhouse)
 Mame – Cousin Fan – (Hollywood Bowl)
 Without a Net Improv – Member – (NYC Improv Group)
 About Face – Maggie – (BMI Theatre)
 Fireflies in the Sun – Linda – (Greenwich Theatre)
 Gatsby Concert – Lucinda the Maid – (Time Warner Theatre)
 Working – Waitress – (Circle in the Square Theatre)

Broadway
 Grease – Frenchie
 Hello, Dolly! – Minnie Fay
 More To Love – Maxine

Video games 
 RTX Red Rock (2003) – I.R.I.S.
 Barbie Rapunzel – Rapunzel

Commercials 
Monica Lee has done commercials for over 20 major companies including GMC, Honda, Wendy's, and the NHL on FOX.

External links
Official Website

American voice actresses
Living people
People from Jeannette, Pennsylvania
1971 births
New York University alumni
Actresses from Pennsylvania
20th-century American actresses
21st-century American actresses